Morton Hall is a small village in the civil parish of Swinderby , in the North Kesteven district of Lincolnshire, England.

Morton Hall is served by Swinderby railway station, just outside the village to the west.

Morton Hall Immigration Removal Centre is in the village. It was originally the site of an RAF base, which was converted into a prison in 1985. The facility was converted into an immigration removal centre in 2011.

References

External links
 Morton Hall village website

Villages in Lincolnshire
North Kesteven District